Gwaun may refer to the following places in Wales:

Cwm Gwaun, village and community in Pembrokeshire
Gwaun-Cae-Gurwen, village in Neath Port Talbot
River Gwaun, river in Pembrokeshire